Nascent may refer to:

 Nascent, a 2005 Australian dance film with choreography by Garry Stewart
 Nascent (film), a 2016 Central African short documentary film by Lindsay Branham  and Jon Kasbe

See also
 
 
 Nascent hydrogen, discredited concept
 Nascent state (chemistry), obsolete theory in chemistry
 Nascent-polypeptide-associated complex alpha polypeptide, a human gene